His Majesty's Opponent or His Majesty's Opponent: Subhas Chandra Bose and India's Struggle Against Empire is an English book written by Sugata Bose. This is a biography of Subhas Chandra Bose. The book was first published in May 2011.

Reception 
Hindustan Times wrote in their review that the book was a "template biography", and was "arrestingly written".

References

External links 
 Book details at Goodreads

2011 non-fiction books
Cultural depictions of Subhas Chandra Bose
Belknap Press books